Alyssa Elaine Diaz (born September 7, 1985) is an American actress. She is known for her roles on television, such as Celia Ortega on the CBS daytime soap opera As the World Turns, Jasmine on the ABC Family series The Nine Lives of Chloe King, Gloria Cruz on Lifetime's Army Wives, Teresa on Showtime's Ray Donovan, Dariela Marzan on the CBS series Zoo, and Officer (later Detective) Angela Lopez on the ABC series The Rookie.

Early life and education
Diaz was born in Northridge neighborhood of Los Angeles, California on September 7, 1985. She is of Colombian and Mexican parentage.

Career
Diaz is an actor known for her recurring roles on several series, including Army Wives, Ray Donovan, and the soap opera As The World Turns. She had her breakout film role in the remake of Red Dawn. She has made other appearances, guest-starring in television shows including  Southland, CSI: NY and Lie to Me. She starred in the film How the Garcia Girls Spent Their Summer, and in such television films as Ben 10: Alien Swarm and The Jensen Project.

In 2011, she was cast in the starring role of Jasmine on the ABC Family series The Nine Lives of Chloe King. In 2012, she landed the recurring role of Gloria Cruz on Army Wives. She was upgraded to series regular for the seventh season, which started in March 2013. She has also appeared in The Vampire Diaries. In March 2016, Diaz landed the role as Dariela, a series regular, on the CBS drama Zoo for its second season. She currently plays Mika Camarena, the wife of Kiki Camarena, slain DEA agent, in the Netflix series Narcos: Mexico.  She also currently plays Detective first grade Angela Lopez on the ABC drama The Rookie.

Personal life 
Diaz is engaged to singer/songwriter Gustavo Galindo. On December 28, 2020, Diaz announced on her Instagram that she and Galindo had become parents of a baby boy. Her pregnancy was written into her The Rookie character.

Filmography

Film

Television

See also
List of Colombians
List of Mexicans

References

External links

 
 

1985 births
21st-century American actresses
American film actresses
American people of Colombian descent
American actresses of Mexican descent
American soap opera actresses
American television actresses
Living people
Actresses from Los Angeles
Hispanic and Latino American actresses